Teddy Hill (December 7, 1909 in Birmingham, Alabama – May 19, 1978 in Cleveland, Ohio) was an American big band leader and the manager of Minton's Playhouse, a seminal jazz club in Harlem. He played a variety of instruments, including drums, clarinet, soprano and tenor saxophone.

Life and career
After moving to New York City, Hill had early gigs with the Whitman Sisters, George Howe and Luis Russell's orchestra in the 1920s, later forming his own band in 1934, which found steady work over the NBC radio network. Over several years it featured such major young musicians as Roy Eldridge, Bill Coleman, Frankie Newton and Dizzy Gillespie. Hill's band played at the Savoy Ballroom regularly, and toured England and France in the summer of 1937. After leaving the band business, Hill began to manage Minton's Playhouse in 1940, which became a hub for the bebop style, featuring such major musicians as Thelonious Monk and Kenny Clarke. Hill left Minton's in 1969, long after its musical significance had declined; he then became the manager of Baron's Lounge.

Recording career
In 1935, he recorded a four-song session for ARC (Banner, Conqueror, Melotone, Oriole, Perfect, Romeo). In 1936, he recorded two sessions (four tunes) for Vocalion. He signed with Bluebird in 1937 and recorded 18 songs over three sessions.

Personal life
Teddy Hill married Louise Welton in the 1920s.  Their daughter Gwendolyn Louise Hill was born in 1930.  Over time, Teddy and Louise separated and eventually divorced.

In the late 1930s,  a singer named Bonnie Davis started working in his band. They later had a daughter together, Beatrice Hill, who would become known under the stage name Melba Moore.

Discography
1935: Teddy Hill And His Orchestra (Bill Coleman, Roy Eldridge, Bill Dillard, Dicky Wells, Russell Procope, Howard E. Johnson, Chu Berry, Teddy Hill, Sam Allen, John Smith, Richard Fullbright, Bill Beason):
 "(Lookie, Lookie, Lookie) Here Comes Cookie"
 "Got Me Doin' Things"
 "When The Robin Sings His Song Again"
 "When Love Knocks At Your Heart"

1936: Teddy Hill And His Orchestra (Shad Collins, Bill Dillard, Frank Newton, Dicky Wells, Russell Procope, Howard Johnson, Teddy Hill, Kenneth Hollon - later replaced by Cecil Scott, Sam Allen, John Smith, Richard Fullbright, Bill Beason):
 "Uptown Rhapsody"
 "Christopher Columbus"
 "Passionette"
 "At the Rug Cutters' Ball"

1937: Teddy Hill And His NBC Orchestra (Shad Collins, Frank Newton, Bill Dillard, Dicky Wells, Russell Procope, Cecil Scott, Howard Johnson, Teddy Hill, Sam Allen, John Smith, Richard Fullbright, Bill Beason, Beatrice Douglas):
 "The Love Bug Will Bite You"
 "Would You Like To Buy A Dream"
 "Big Boy Blue"
 "Where Is The Sun"
 "The Harlem Twister (The New Sensation)"
 "My Marie"
 "I Know Now"
 "The Lady Who Couldn't Be Kissed"
 "(Have You Forgotten) The You And Me That Used To Be"
 "A Study in Brown"
 "Twilight in Turkey"
 "China Boy"

1937: Teddy Hill And His Orchestra (Shad Collins, Dizzy Gillespie, Bill Dillard, Dicky Wells, Russell Procope, Howard Johnson, Robert Carroll, Teddy Hill, Sam Allen, John Smith, Richard Fullbright, Bill Beason):
 "San Anton'"
 "I'm Happy, Darling, Dancing With You"
 "Yours And Mine"
 "I'm Feeling Like A Million"
 "King Porter Stomp"
 "Blue Rhythm Fantasy" (Included in The Complete RCA Victor Recordings, among others)

References

1909 births
1978 deaths
Big band bandleaders
American jazz bandleaders
20th-century American musicians